Eli Hurvitz ( born 27 November 1970) is the Executive Director of the Trump Foundation, which "aims to serve as a catalyst for improving educational achievement in Israel in Mathematics and the Sciences" and former member of the Israel National Board of Education. Between 2000-2011 Hurvitz served as the Deputy Director of Yad Hanadiv, the Rothschild Family Foundation, and previously as an advisor to the Chairman of the Foreign Affairs and Defense Committee at the Knesset.

Biography
Hurvitz was born and educated in Jerusalem, to Yair (Esq.), former Director General of the State Comptroller of Israel, and Professor Haggit (M.D.), former Head of Pediatrics at the Bikur Holim Hospital. He is the first grandchild of Eliyahu Meridor, and is named after him. His uncles are Dan Meridor, former Deputy Prime Minister of Israel, and Sallai Meridor, former Israeli Ambassador to the US and Chairman of the Jewish Agency.

Hurvitz earned his B.A. and M.A. degrees magna cum laude at the Tel Aviv University’s School of History. His M.A. thesis, titled ‘The Military Wing of Hizballah: a Social Profile’ was published by the Dayan Center in 1999. From 2009 Hurvitz writes on social affairs and philanthropy for The Marker' daily newspaper and in a blog, labeled ‘The Fourth Generation’.

Career in Philanthropy
Between 2000 and 2011, Hurvitz served as the Deputy Director of Yad Hanadiv, with direct responsibility for planning, development, administration and monitoring of the foundation’s programs and projects in Israel. He led a strategic and organizational change aimed to scale up activities, including the recruitment, training and mentoring of new staff. Hurvitz initiated the creation of institutions and served as director of those institutions founded by Yad Hanadiv, including: the Israel Institute for School Leadership, NPTech Technologies and Guidestar Israel, and the Hemda Science Teaching Centre. In the early 2000s, he led Yad-Hanadiv’s efforts to establish a new National Library for Israel, and represented the foundation in the Committee for Changing the Status of the National Library of Israel, headed by Supreme Court Judge, Yitzhak Zamir.

In 2011, Hurvitz joined as Executive Director to set up the Trump Foundation, a new philanthropic foundation that aims to serve as a catalyst for improving educational achievement in Israel by cultivating high-quality teaching in schools with an emphasis on Mathematics and the Sciences. The foundation concentrates on three strategies which directly influence classroom instruction focusing on the talent, expertise and practice of teachers. 
In 2012 Hurvitz joined the Hakol Chinuch Movement, as member of the Board of Directors. At the same year, Hurvitz was selected by The Marker Magazine as #87 at "Israel's 100 Most Influential People". in 2014 he was appointed by the Israeli government as member of the National Board of Education. In 2015 Hurvitz was selected by Yediot Ahronot Newspaper to the list of 'Israel's 50 Heroes of Civil Society'. In 2016 he was nominated by The Marker'' Magazine as #57 at "Israel's 100 Most Influential People". In 2019 Hurvitz joined the Global Advisory Board of the Center for Effective Philanthropy.

Op-Ed Articles
 'In search for a new young leadership', Aug.9th, 2011.
 'Social yellow pages', Jan.6th, 2011.
 'Social venture funds', Jul.20th, 2010.
 'Teaching as a clinical profession', Apr.1st, 2010.
 'Social Intention Test', Feb. 12th, 2009.
 'Four steps to upgrade the Israeli Social Sector', Nov. 23rd, 2009.
 'Criteria for Social Value', Sep.9th, 2009.

References

External links

1970 births
Israeli businesspeople
Israeli educators
People from Jerusalem
Living people
Israeli philanthropists